Kingdom Come is an unincorporated community in  Letcher County, Kentucky, United States.

The name was likely taken from the Lord's Prayer.

References

Unincorporated communities in Letcher County, Kentucky
Unincorporated communities in Kentucky